"Love Letter" is the first single album by South Korean girl group Berry Good. It was released on May 22, 2014, one day after the music video for title track "Love Letter", which is a remake of the song released by Click-B in 2000.

Track listing

References 

Songs about letters (message)
2014 singles
Korean-language songs
2014 songs